The An-26 crash near Voronezh was an aviation accident that occurred on February 24, 2022 in the village of Uryv-Pokrovka near Voronezh. The An-26 aircraft of the Russian Aerospace Forces was making a planned flight to transport military equipment, the plane collapsed in the air. The debris fell between the villages of Devitsa and Uryv-Pokrovka, about 130 kilometers (approximately 81 miles) from the border of Ukraine.

Crash 
The first to see the crash were the people living in the village of Troitskoe.  All crew members died as a result of the accident.  The press service of the Ministry of Defense reported that the preliminary cause of the disaster is the failure of equipment.

Investigation 
After the crash, a group of investigators arrived in Uryv-Pokrovka. No signs of fire were found at the crash site.  The wreckage of the aircraft scattered over a large area.  Investigators found a well-preserved tail section that fell 30 meters from residential buildings. Later, elements of the crew's equipment were found.

References 

Aviation accidents and incidents in Russia in 2022
Aviation accidents and incidents in 2022
February 2022 events in Russia
Aviation accidents and incidents in Russia
Accidents and incidents involving military aircraft
Voronezh Oblast